The Harava Solar Power Station, is a  solar power plant under construction in Zimbabwe. The project is owned and under development by Harava Solar Limited and entity owned by the Seke Community, in partnership with the Government of Zimbabwe. The energy generated here will be purchased by Zimbabwe Electricity Supply Authority (ZESA), under a 25-year power purchase agreement (PPA).

Location

Overview
The power station has a capacity of 20 megawatts, to be sold directly to ZESA for integration into the national electricity grid. The electricity is evacuated via a new , 132kV high voltage transmission line that transmits the power to the new 330kV substation at Dema Power Station, where it enters the national grid.

Developers
The power station was developed by a special purpose vehicle company, Harava Solar Limited, specifically set up to develop, build and operate this solar power station. Harava Solar is a joint venture between the Seke Community and the Zimbabwean Ministry of Energy and Power Development.

Construction timeline, costs and funding
The cost of construction was budgeted at US$25 million, fully funded by the Zimbabwean government. The power station was expected to begin commercial operations in November 2021.

Controversy
In the second half of 2019, Soventix SA of Germany, the engineering, procurement and construction (EPC) contractor stopped paying eXess Africa of South Africa, a sub-contactor on the project. When negotiations failed the matter was taken to court, with eXess Africa demanding over US$1 million in unpaid claims for installed capacity of 6MW and a substation. Harava Solar is counterclaiming material (steel pipes) removed from the site by the subcontractor's officials, when payment was not forthcoming. Work on the power station stalled in 2021.

See also

List of power stations in Zimbabwe
Kwekwe Solar Power Station

References

External links
 Website of Ministry of Energy and Power, Zimbabwe

Solar power stations in Zimbabwe
Mashonaland East Province